Ukaan (also Ikan, Anyaran, Auga, or Kakumo) is a poorly described Niger–Congo language or dialect cluster of uncertain affiliation.
Roger Blench suspects, based on wordlists, that it might be closest to the (East) Benue–Congo languages (or, equivalently, the most divergent of the Benue–Congo languages). Blench (2012) states that "noun-classes and concord make it look Benue-Congo, but evidence is weak."

Speakers refer to their language as Ùkãã or Ìkã.

Varieties
The name Anyaran is from the town of Anyaran, where it is spoken. Ukaan has several divergent dialects: Ukaan proper, Igau, Ayegbe (Iisheu), Iinno (Iyinno), which only have one-way intelligibility in some cases.

Roger Blench (2005, 2019) considers Ukaan to consist of at least 3 different languages, and notes that Ukaan varieties spoken in Ìshè,̣ Ẹkakumọ, and Auga all have different lexemes.

Salffner (2009: 27) lists the following four dialects of Ukaan.

Ikaan: spoken in Ikakumo and Ikakumo (Edo State)
Ayegbe: spoken in Ise
Iigau or Iigao: spoken in Auga
Iino: spoken in Ayanran

Distribution
Ethnologue lists the following locations where Ukaan is spoken.
Ondo State: Akoko North-East LGA
Edo State: Akoko Edo LGA
Kogi State: Ijumu LGA (Anyaran, Auga, and Ishe towns)

Blench (2019) lists Ondo State, Akoko North LGA, towns of Kakumo–Aworo (Kakumo–Kejĩ, Auga and Iṣe); Edo State, Akoko Edo LGA, towns of Kakumo–Akoko and Anyaran.

Reconstruction
Proto-Ukaan has been reconstructed by Abiodun (1999).

See also
List of Proto-Ukaan reconstructions (Wiktionary)

References

External links 
 ELAR archive of Farming, food and yam: language and cultural practices among Ikaan speakers
Roger Blench: Aika (Ukaan) materials

Niger–Congo languages
Languages of Nigeria
Ondo State
Benue–Congo languages